The 2 November 2010 Baghdad attacks were a series of bomb attacks in Baghdad, Iraq that killed more than 110 people.

At least 17 explosions occurred in the attacks, 48 hours after the 2010 Baghdad church massacre where 58 people were killed by a suicide bomber in a Baghdad church. Al-Qaeda has been suggested to be behind the violence. It is estimated that seventeen coordinated car bombs exploded. More than 250 people have been killed in Iraq in the last six days.

The political background is the race between Prime Minister Nouri Maliki, a Shia Islamist, and former Prime Minister Iyad Allawi, a secular Shia supported by Iraq's Sunnis. Iyad Allawi's political group won two more parliamentary seats than the Prime Minister's.

There were explosions near east Baghdad Sadr City, where 15 people died and 23 wounded. In west Baghdad 54 people died. There were twenty one blasts in all, eleven of them were car blasts.

In western Baghdad the casualties and injured people took to the Yarmuk Hospital. Al-Qaeda's Iraqi affiliate said on Friday it was behind car bombings against Shias in Baghdad this week that killed 64 people, saying they were revenge for "insults" and threatening more attacks. In a statement on the Al-Hanein jihadi website, the Islamic State of Iraq (ISI) said Tuesday's attacks were to avenge "insults" against Aisha, the wife of Islam's Prophet Mohammed.

See also

 List of terrorist incidents, 2010

References

2010 murders in Iraq
21st-century mass murder in Iraq
Mass murder in 2010
2010 in Iraq
Car and truck bombings in Iraq
Terrorist incidents in Iraq in 2010
2010s in Baghdad
Terrorist incidents in Sadr City
November 2010 crimes
November 2010 events in Iraq
Mass murder in Baghdad